Hamouro is a village in the commune of Bandrele on Mayotte, France.

References

Populated places in Mayotte